Campionato Sammarinese di Calcio (English translation: Sammarinese Football Championship) is an amateur league competition for football clubs located at the only level of the Sammarinese football league system (no relegation system exists) and has been operating since the 1985–1986 season. Currently, Campionato Sammarinese di Calcio is ranked last at number 55 among European leagues according to UEFA's league coefficient, which is based on the performance of Sammarinese clubs in the Champions League, Europa League and the Europa Conference League.

Rules
Until 1996, the league had two levels, Serie A1 and Serie A2, and a relegation/promotion system. However, the teams promoted from the second level could also participate in the championship play-off against Serie A1's first teams. All the clubs play at the same level since then. Before 2018–2019 season, they were split into two divisions called Girone (or "Groups"). The teams played home and away matches in their girone and once against the teams from the other girone. The first three teams in each girone entered a double-elimination play-off tournament, which was the only seen in association football world, to decide the championship winners, who qualified for the UEFA Champions League preliminary phase.

In the 2018–2019 season, the rules changed. All the clubs were still split into two girone. The teams played once against the other teams in the same girone. The top four teams in each girone proceeded to group 1 in the second stage, while the others proceeded to group 2. Teams played twice against each team in the same group. The second and the third team in group 2 proceeded to the play-off. The winner of the play-off, the top team in group 2 and the top 6 teams in group 1 proceeded to the final stage. The championship winner qualified for the UEFA Champions League preliminary phase and the first runner-up qualified for the Europa League preliminary phase.

In the 2020–2021 season, a new format was applied. Now, all the clubs play in the same league and they play each team twice, reflecting the systems of other leagues in Europe. At the end of the regular season, the top twelve placed teams will proceed to the play-off tournament, deciding the championship winner, who qualifies for the UEFA Champions League preliminary phase, and the loser of the final who will qualify for the Europa Conference League preliminary phase.

The domestic cup winners qualify for the Europa Conference League preliminary phase.

Grounds

Sanmarinese teams do not have home grounds of their own. Instead, the following venues are randomly chosen for every match:
 Dogana ground (located in a frazione of Serravalle)
 Fiorentino ground
 the Fonte dell'Ovo ground (located in Domagnano)
 Serravalle "B" ground
 Domagnano ground

Sometimes the Stadio Olimpico, based in Serravalle, is also used. Since there are not many grounds, matches are played on two days of each week, usually Saturday and Sunday. The play-off finals and the European fixtures are always played in the Stadio Olimpico.

Teams participating in 2022–23 season
There are 15 teams in Campionato Sammarinese.

 Cailungo (Borgo Maggiore)
 Cosmos (Serravalle)
 Domagnano (Domagnano)
 Faetano (Faetano)
 Fiorentino (Fiorentino)
 Folgore (Serravalle)
 Juvenes/Dogana (Serravalle)
 La Fiorita (Montegiardino)
 Libertas (Borgo Maggiore)
 Murata (San Marino)
 Pennarossa (Chiesanuova)
 San Giovanni (Borgo Maggiore)
 Tre Fiori (Fiorentino)
 Tre Penne (San Marino)
 Virtus (Acquaviva)

Champions

Winners by season

Remarks: The 2019-20 Season was abandoned due to the pandemic situation. Tre Fiori, with the highest points obtained before the suspension, was crowned the champion and qualified for the UEFA Champions League.

Titles by team

Top scorers

See also 

 List of association football competitions

References

External links
 Federazione Sammarinese Giuoco Calcio official site
San Marino – List of Champions, RSSSF.com
Campionato Sammarinese di Calcio summary – Soccerway

 
1
San Marino
1985 establishments in San Marino
Sports leagues established in 1985